Kilij Arslan IV or Rukn ad-Dīn Qilij Arslān ibn Kaykhusraw was Seljuq Sultan of Rûm after the death of his father Kaykhusraw II in 1246.

However, a jarlig issued by Güyük Khan confirmed him as sultan over his elder brother, Kaykaus II in 1248. But this jarlig would quickly be worthless after Güyük's death in the same year. Later, Arslan's supporters killed Shams al-Din Isfahani, a supporter of his brother, Kaykaus II (a rival to the throne). The death of Isfahani's successor in 1254, Jalāl-al-Din Qaraṭāy, left a power vacuum which was filled by competition by supporters of the two brothers. Eventually, Kaykaus II would emerge the victor in 1256.

In the 1260s, Mu'in al-Din Parwana redistributed Seljuk crown lands among his followers. He did this to secure his position but would be met with protests from Arslan. This eventually led to Arslan's execution in 1265 by Parwana.

References

Sources
 
  
 
 

Sultans of Rum
1266 deaths
Year of birth unknown
13th-century Turkic people